Enrekang Regency is an inland regency of South Sulawesi Province of Indonesia. It covers an area of 1,786.01 km2 and had a population of 190,175 at the 2010 Census and 225,172 at the 2020 Census; the official estimate as at mid 2021 was 227,520. The principal town lies at Enrekang.

Administrative districts 
Enrekang Regency comprises twelve administrative Districts (Kecamatan), tabulated below with their areas and their populations at the 2010 Census and the 2020 Census, together with the official estimates as at mid 2021. The table also includes the locations of the district administrative centres, the number of administrative villages (rural desa and urban kelurahan) in each district, and its post code.

Climate
Enrekang has a tropical rainforest climate (Af) with heavy rainfall year-round. The following climate data is for the town of Enrekang.

References

Regencies of South Sulawesi